TISS was established in 1936 as Sir Dorabji Tata Graduate School of Social Work in Mumbai. It was renamed to its current name Tata Institute of Social Sciences in 1944. TISS Mumbai is the main campus of the TISS. In the year 1964, it was deemed to be a University under Section 3 of the University Grants Commission Act (UGC), 1956. TISS Mumbai provides various M.A., M.Phil & Ph.D programs. Over the years, TISS Mumbai is well known for its contribution through research in social work, social sciences, human resources management & health systems.

Schools 
TISS Mumbai hosts the following Schools
 School of Education - Master's level courses in Elementary Education
 School of Development Studies - Master's level courses in Development Studies and Women's Studies
 School of Habitat Studies - Master's level courses in Climate Change and Sustainability Studies, Urban Policy, Regulatory Governance, and Water Policy and Governance
 School of Health Systems Studies - Master's level courses in Health Administration, Hospital Administration, Social Epidemiology and Health Policy
 School of Human Ecology -  Master's level courses in Applied Psychology, Clinical Psychology and Counselling Psychology.
 School of Law, Rights and Constitutional Governance - L.L.M. in Access to Justice
 School of Management and Labour Studies - Master's level courses in Human Resource Management, Labour Relations, Social Entrepreneurship, Globalisation and Labour, 14 month Executive Post Graduate Diploma in Organisation Development and Change (EPGDODC) from Mumbai,Delhi and Bangalore.
 School of Media and Cultural Studies - Master's level courses in Media and Cultural Studies
 School of Social Work - Master's level courses in Social Work with Children & Families, Criminology & Justice, Community Organisation & Development Practice, Dalit & Tribal Studies and Action, Disability Studies & Action, Livelihoods and Social Entrepreneurship, Mental Health, Public Health, Women-Centred Practice
 Jamsetji Tata School of Disaster Studies - Master's programme in Disaster Management

Independent Centres 
 Centre for Education Innovation and Action Research
 Centre for Excellence on Adolescents and Youth
 Centre for Lifelong Learning
 Centre for Studies in Sociology of Education
 Centre for Study of Social Exclusion and Inclusive Policies
 Centre for Library and Information Management & SDTM Library
Jamsetji Tata Centre for Disaster Management

Resource Centres 
 Computer Centre
 Publications Unit

Sir Dorabji Tata Memorial Library 
TISS Library was established along with the institute in 1936, is one of the leading social science libraries in the country. The library was named as "Sir Dorabji Tata Memorial Library" on 3 May 2002 in the memory of late Sir Dorabjii Tata. Indian Library Association conferred the library with L. M. Padhya Best University Library Award in 2008.

Currently, the library about 123,000 books and 10,298 journals in principle domains of social sciences. The library also operates centre with assistive technologies "M K Tata Centre for the Visually Challenged and a cyber library which provides computers and internet to the students from economically weaker sections. The library has established national and international collaborations including London School Of Economics Library, Mahasarakham University, International Federation of Library Association.".

Major Ongoing Field Action Projects 
 M-Ward transformation programme
 I-Access
 Koshish
 Prayaas
 Towards Advocacy Networking and Developmental Action (TANDA)
 RCI-VAW: The Resource Centre for Interventions on Violence against Women
 Tarasha: A community-based project for rehabilitation of women recovering from mental illness
 iCALL: Initiating Concern for All
 Urban India Research Facility'
 Resource Cell for Juvenile Justice (RCJJ)

See also
 TISS Hyderabad

References

Tata Institute of Social Sciences